An outdoor bronze sculpture of Giuseppe Garibaldi, one of the leaders of Italian unification, is installed in Washington Square Park in Manhattan, New York.

Description and history
The statue and its granite pedestal were created by Giovanni Turini upon the organization of the editors of the newspaper Il Progresso Italo-Americano to raise funds to commemorate Garibaldi after his death. Turini was a volunteer member of Garibaldi's Fourth Regiment in the campaign against Austria in 1866. The statue was dedicated on June 4, 1888.

In 1970, in order to construct a new promenade through the park, the statue was moved fifteen feet to the east. During its movement, a glass vessel from the 1880s was discovered beneath the statue containing newspaper articles of Garibaldi's death, a history of the Committee for the Monument of Garibaldi, and poster and news clippings describing the statue's dedication.

See also

 1888 in art

References

External links
 
 It Happened on Washington Square by Emily Kies Folpe (p. 118)

1888 establishments in New York (state)
1888 sculptures
Bronze sculptures in Manhattan
Cultural depictions of Giuseppe Garibaldi
Monuments and memorials in Manhattan
Outdoor sculptures in Manhattan
Sculptures of men in New York City
Statues in New York City
Statues of politicians
Greenwich Village